Snelling & County Road B is a bus rapid transit station on the A Line in Roseville, Minnesota.

The station is located at the intersection of County Road B with Snelling Avenue. The southbound station platform is southwest of County Road B, while the northbound station platform is located between County Road B and the entrance road to Har Mar Mall. Buses approaching the station will announce "This stop for Har Mar Mall."

The station opened June 11, 2016 with the rest of the A Line.

Bus connections
Connections to local bus Route 65 can be made on County Road B. Route 84, predecessor to the A Line, stopped at the station until December 1, 2018.

Notable places nearby
Har Mar Mall
Ramsey County Library Roseville

References

External links 
 Metro Transit: Snelling & County Road B Station

Bus stations in Minnesota